GWC may refer to:

 Dutch West India Company
 Gambian Workers' Confederation, a Gambian trade union
 General Watch Co, a defunct Swiss watchmaker
 George Watson's College, in Edinburgh, Scotland
 George Whitefield College, in Cape Town, South Africa
 George Wythe College, now George Wythe University, in Salt Lake City, Utah, United States
 Global Water Challenge, a water resource charity
 Global Wildlife Center, a conservation charity
 Gnome Wave Cleaner, audio software
 Golden West College, in Huntington Beach, California, United States
 Golden West Colleges, in the Philippines
 Government Wine Cellar, of the government of the United Kingdom
 Great West Conference, an American college athletic conference
 The Great Western Chorus of Bristol, a British choir
 Green–white–checker finish, a procedure in North American auto racing
 Green Worker Cooperatives, a worker cooperative incubator in New York City
 Kalami language, spoken in Pakistan